The 1971–72 All-Ireland Senior Club Hurling Championship was the second staging of the All-Ireland Senior Club Hurling Championship, the Gaelic Athletic Association's premier inter-county club hurling tournament. The championship began on 14 November 1971 and ended on 14 May 1972.

Roscrea of Tipperary were the defending champions, however, they failed to qualify after being defeated by Moyne-Templetuohy in Tipperary Championship.

On 14 May 1972, Blackrock won the championship after a 5–13 to 6–09 defeat of Rathnure in the All-Ireland final. It was their first ever championship title.

Qualification

Results

Connacht Senior Club Hurling Championship

First round

Semi-final

Final

Leinster Senior Club Hurling Championship

First round

Quarter-finals

Semi-finals

Final

Munster Senior Club Hurling Championship

Quarter-finals

Semi-finals

Final

All-Ireland Senior Club Hurling Championship

Semi-finals

Final

Championship statistics

Scoring

Overall

Miscellaneous

 Blackrock became the third team from Cork to win the Munster title.

References

1971 in hurling
1972 in hurling
All-Ireland Senior Club Hurling Championship